The Lake-Side Terrace Apartments is a historic apartment building at 7425-7427 South Shore Drive in the South Shore neighborhood of Chicago, Illinois. Built in 1922–23, the building is an example of a courtyard apartment, a popular apartment style in early 20th century Chicago.  As the building adjoins Lake Michigan, its courtyard opens toward the lake; the courtyard is also elevated to enhance its lake view. Chicago architect Eric Edwin Hall designed the Tudor Revival building. The four-story brick building features limestone entrance and window surrounds, Tudor arched entrances to the courtyard, and a battlement along the roof.

The building was added to the National Register of Historic Places on November 13, 1984.

References

Residential buildings on the National Register of Historic Places in Chicago
Tudor Revival architecture in Illinois
Residential buildings completed in 1923
Apartment buildings in Chicago